The A. D. Patel Institute of Technology (ADIT) is a degree engineering college established by in 2000 in affiliation with Gujarat Technological University under the management of Charutar Vidhya Mandal (CVM). The college has a  campus developed by CVM as New Vallabh Vidhyanagar.

Academics

Undergraduate programs
ADIT offers Bachelor of Engineering programs in following branches and is affiliated to CVM University. The admission to these programs is done through Admission Committee for Professional Courses - Gujarat State (ACPC).

Automobile Engineering
Computer Engineering
Electrical Engineering
Electronics and Communication Engineering
Food Processing Technology
Information Technology
Mechanical Engineering
Civil Engineering

Postgraduate programs 
ADIT also offers post graduate programs awarding Master of Engineering and Master of Technology degree in following fields in affiliation to CVM University. The admission to these courses is done through Admission Committee for Professional Courses - Gujarat State (ACPC) based on GATE scores as well as Gujarat PGCET entrance examination conducted by ACPC.

Programs 
M.E. (Signal Processing and Communication)
M.E. (Thermal Engineering)
M.E. (CAD/CAM)
M.Tech (Renewable Energy)
M.Tech (Artificial Intelligence)
M.Tech (Food Technology)

References

External links 
 

Engineering colleges in Gujarat
Education in Anand district
Educational institutions established in 2000
2000 establishments in Gujarat